Mangavi (also Romanized as Mangāvī; also known as Mankāvī) is a village in Tork-e Gharbi Rural District, Jowkar District, Malayer County, Hamadan Province, Iran. At the 2006 census, its population was 1,934, in 459 families.

References 

Populated places in Malayer County